The 2018 Colonial Athletic Association football season was the twelfth season of football for the Colonial Athletic Association (CAA) and part of the 2018 NCAA Division I FCS football season.

Previous season

Head coaches

Records are as of November 18, 2017

Rankings

Regular season

All times Eastern time.

Rankings reflect that of the STATS FCS poll for that week.

Week 1

Players of the week:

Week 2

Players of the week:

Week 3

Players of the week:

Week 4

Players of the week:

Week 5

Players of the week:

Week 6

Players of the week:

Week 7

Players of the week:

Week 8

Players of the week:

Week 9

Players of the week:

Week 10

Players of the week:

Week 11

Players of the week:

Week 12

Players of the week:

Attendance

References